Fiori may refer to:

Fiori (pasta), a decorative shape of extruded pasta
Fiori (surname), various people with the surname
Fiori musicali, a collection of liturgical organ music by Girolamo Frescobaldi, first published in 1635
Campo de' Fiori, a rectangular square south of Piazza Navona in Rome, Italy
S.P. Tre Fiori (Società Polisportiva Tre Fiori), a Sanmarinese football club

See also
Fiore (disambiguation)